James Newlin Hill (1934–1997) was a prominent processualist archaeologist (a student of Lewis Binford).

Hill did most of his work in the American South West, published several papers on the Broken K Pueblo, Arizona. This study in particular has been described as "a classic example of how social organization may be reflected in the architectural segregation of pottery styles" (Sackett 1997). He believed that culture could (and perhaps should) be inferred from archaeological data.

Biography 
 1957 B.A. History, Pomona College
 Three year Stint in the U.S. Navy
 1963 M.A. University of Chicago
 1965 Ph.D. University of Chicago
 1965–1997 Taught at UCLA

Works 
 A Prehistoric Community in Eastern Arizona (1966)
 Broken K Pueblo: Prehistoric Social Organization in the American Southwest (1970 [1965])
 Individuals and Their Artifacts: An Experimental Study in Archaeology (1978)
 Pollen at Broken K Pueblo: Some New Interpretations (1968) written with Richard H. Hevly
  “Broken K Pueblo: pattern of form and function” (1968)

References 
 1997 Sackett, James R. IN MEMORIAM : James N. Hill : This important archaeologist's passing is a loss for the UCLA community. Electronic Resource. 
 n.d. Skarohlid, Mary. James Newlin Hill: 1934-1997. Electronic Resources. 

1943 births
1997 deaths
University of California, Los Angeles faculty
Pomona College alumni
20th-century American archaeologists
Historians from California